ݙ is an additional letter of the Arabic script, not used in the Arabic alphabet itself but used in Saraiki to represent a voiced alveolar implosive, .
Its other form is also found in Saraiki Spoken in Jhang in the form of voiced retroflex implosive, .

It is written as ॾ in Saraiki and Sindhi's Devanagari orthography.
It is derived from dāl (د), with a small ṭāʼ (ط) above to represent retroflexion (as in Urdu), and two dots below to represent implosion (as in Sindhi). The unicode for saraiki letter ݙ was approved in 2005.

Forms
The letter ݙ has 2 forms.

It may not rendered or joined if you are using a custom font because it's in Arabic Supplement block but not Arabic block. Some Apple users also won't render because Apple is using various fonts to render Arabic text. For other uses, see Help:Arabic.

See also
ٻ
ڄ
ڳ
ݨ

References

External links 
 Saraiki Omniglot
 Saraiki Alphabet

D